Mona Shourie Kapoor (3 February 1964 – 25 March 2012) was an Indian television producer, film producer, and entrepreneur. She was the daughter of Sattee Shourie and first wife of Bollywood producer Boney Kapoor and also the mother of actor Arjun Kapoor.

Early & personal life
Shourie was born in New Delhi on 3 February 1964. She was married to Boney Kapoor from 1983 to 1996 and had two children, son Arjun Kapoor and daughter Anshula Kapoor. Arjun is an actor who made his acting debut with the 2012 film, Ishaqzaade. Anshula, after graduating from École Mondiale World School went to the Barnard College of Columbia University in New York and was working with Google India. 

After splitting from Boney Kapoor in 1996, Mona continued to live with her in-laws. She lived there with her two children until her death on 25 March 2012.

Mona Kapoor's popular films, as a film producer, were Sheesha and Farishtay, under S. G. S. Films. She also produced the popular television show, Yug.

Career

Mona Kapoor was the CEO of Future Studios, an indoor shooting studio in Mumbai. Mona had a multi-faceted career; she successfully handled the manpower for 'Business Aids' & 'Machine Exports', in which she was a partner. As a director of FCL, she was the production co-ordinator for Sheesha and Farishtay. She also served as a jury member of the Indian Telly Awards, in 2005.

Producer
She produced successful television shows like Hera Pheri (on Star Plus featuring Shekhar Suman, Reema Lagoo and Tanaaz Curim), Yug (on Doordarshan), Wilayatee Babu (on Doordarshan) and Kaise Kahoon (TV).

Mona Kapoor was the receiver of few accolades.

She had also production coordinates the films Sheesha and Farishtay. She had worked in 2 films, 5 television shows, and she was a businesswoman.

She was also seen with Karan Razdan, Singer Taz, Abhishek Bachchan and Salman Khan.

She had also worked with Sattee Shourie and Archana Shourie.

Channels
She produced television shows. She had also coordinated in producing the TV Shows, including Kaise Kahoon and Yug. She had produced TV shows like Hera Pheri, Yug, Vilayatee Babu, Sheesha, and Farishtay. Her shows were also shown on Star plus.

Family Support
She was supported by her  daughter Anshula Kapoor and her son Arjun Kapoor and Sanjay Kapoor, her brother-in-law. Kapoor has also production coordinated (Show setup) many television shows in the 1980s.

Death
Kapoor died due to multiple organ failure after battling with cancer and hypertension on 25 March 2012 in presence of her children.

References

Indian women television producers
Indian television producers
Indian women film producers
Film producers from Delhi
1964 births
2012 deaths
20th-century Indian businesspeople
Businesswomen from Delhi
20th-century Indian businesswomen
Women television producers